Slovakia competed at the 2006 Winter Olympics in Turin, Italy.

Medalists

Židek's silver medal was the first Winter Olympic medal won by Slovakia as an independent nation.

Alpine skiing

The top finish for the six-person Slovak alpine team came from Veronika Zuzulová, who finished 15th in the women's combined.

Note: In the men's combined, run 1 is the downhill, and runs 2 and 3 are the slalom. In the women's combined, run 1 and 2 are the slalom, and run 3 the downhill.

Biathlon 

Marek Matiaško had the best result out of the Slovak biathlon team, with a surprising 5th place finish in the men's individual. He missed only one shot, and the resultant time penalty meant that he fell short of the medals.

Men

Women

Bobsleigh 

Milan Jagnešák piloted the Slovak sled in both the two-man and four-man events, but did not manage a top-20 finish in either.

Cross-country skiing 

Martin Bajčičák finished 8th in the men's pursuit, the best showing from any Slovak cross-country skier, and carried the nation's flag in the closing ceremonies.

Distance

Sprint

Ice hockey 

The Slovak team finished atop its round-robin group, going undefeated through the opening round, including a 3–0 win over eventual gold medal winners Sweden. In the quarterfinals, however, the team fell to rivals Czech Republic 3–1, failing to advance to a medal game.

Men's tournament

Players

Round-robin

Medal round

Quarterfinal

Luge 

The Slovakian luge delegation was one of the Olympic team's largest, but managed only a single top 15 finish, from the doubles team of Ľubomír Mick and Walter Marx.

Short track speed skating 

The lone Slovak short track speed skater competing in Turin, Matus Uzak, was disqualified from two of his events, and failed to advance from his heat in the third.

Ski jumping 

Martin Mesík represented Slovakia in ski jumping, but did not advance from the qualification round in either the large hill or normal hill events.

Snowboarding 

Radoslav Židek failed to qualify for the medal round in the men's parallel giant slalom, but was more successful in the snowboard cross. Židek qualified in the top ten, then won in three consecutive rounds to make the final. He finished just behind American Seth Wescott, who made a dramatic pass and pipped him to the line. Still, Židek's second place finished earned him a silver medal, the first winter medal in Slovakian Olympic history.

Parallel GS

Snowboard cross

References

Nations at the 2006 Winter Olympics
2006
Winter Olympics